Cipralisant (GT-2331, tentative trade name Perceptin) is an extremely potent histamine H3 receptor ligand originally developed by Gliatech. Cipralisant was initially classified as a selective H3 antagonist, but newer research (2005) suggests also agonist properties, i. e. functional selectivity. Cipralisant seemed to be well tolerated during early testing, entering Phase II trials for ADHD in 2000.

The relatively recent cloning of human H3 receptor, as well as the discovery of its constitutive activity provided the ability to better assess the activity of H3 receptor ligands. Consequently, cipralisant was reassessed as an H3 receptor agonist in human and rat recombinant systems, showing functional selectivity and stimulating one type of G-protein coupled pathway while failing to activate other intracellular pathways.

Gliatech filed for bankruptcy in 2002, and its intellectual property was inherited by Merck. The development of cipralisant seems to have been suspended since 2003 but research is ongoing, and recently it has been shown that it is the (1S,2S)-enantiomer which is the biologically active one.

References

Cyclopropanes
Histamine agonists
Imidazoles